Ding railway station is a main railway station in Sirsa district, Haryana. Its code is DING. It serves Ding town. The station consists of two platforms. The platforms are not well sheltered. It lacks many facilities including water and sanitation. It lies on Hisar–Bathinda line.

References 

Railway stations in Sirsa district
Bikaner railway division